Al Dahra Agricultural Company is an agribusiness firm specializing in the cultivation, production and trading of animal feed and human food commodities such as rice, flour, fruits and vegetables. The group owns and operates a land bank of 200 thousand acres, 8 forage pressing and production plants, 4 rice milling plants and 2 flour milling plants.

Structure
The company has more than 20 distribution sites in UAE and is currently importing from multiple countries, including the United States, Spain, Italy, Poland, Canada, and Pakistan. In addition, the company owns factories and farms in the United States.

Al-Dahra Agriculture Company consists of the following branches:
 Al-Dahra Agricultural company in the United Arab Emirates
 Animal production branch
 Plant product branch
 Animal and plant production branch
 Alfalfa product project
 Al-Dahra Agriculture company in Egypt
 Navigator company
 Emirates International Company
 Al-Dahra Agriculture company in Pakistan

In 2019, Al Dahra acquired Serbia-based agricultural company Poljoprivredna Korporacija Beograd (PKB). Following the acquisition, Al Dahra announced it will build 10 bio gas plants of 999 kW each in Belgrade.

In November 2020, the company signed a deal with the Israeli Watergen company to sell water-from-air units to the region.

References

External links
 Al dahra -Official Website

Agriculture companies of the United Arab Emirates
Animal food manufacturers
Agriculture companies established in 1995
Emirati companies established in 1995